Jayanthi Ballal is an Indian fashion entrepreneur and designer, best known for conceptualising and founding the Mysore Fashion Week.

Early life and education
Jayanthi Ballal was born in Mysore, India on 18 September 1972. Ballal grew up in Mysore and was greatly inspired by traditional Mysore art & clothing. It would go on to greatly influence her work as a designer. At the age of seventeen, Ballal underwent major surgery for a life-threatening cardiac condition.

After graduating with a bachelor's degree in commerce, Ballal obtained training in fashion design at the Vogue Institute of Fashion in Bangalore in 1997.
She started a tiny tailoring unit in her house two decades ago as she was passionate about fabric and designing. Along with taking care of her tailoring unit, she assisted her husband in his production company. She was responsible for marketing and public relations. Later she started the contemporary boutique called Needle Works. To showcase her design and other designers' skills encouraged her to organize more fashion shows. She had done more than 200 fashion shows all over India and launched more than 300 faces. In 2014, she started Mysore Fashion Week on the lines of Lakme Fashion Week which instantly put Mysore on the fashion map of the country.

Design career
After graduating from Vogue, Ballal started her design career with a small tailoring unit in her house in Mysore. This was followed by the launch of a contemporary boutique called Needle Works in 2002. Needle Works has since carved a niche for itself in contemporary ethnic wear for women.

2011 saw Ballal foraying into haute couture with the launch of her fashion label. Since then, top models and actresses including Raveena Tandon, Soha Ali Khan, Bruna Abdullah, Gauahar Khan, Adah Sharma 
 
 

 and others have walked the ramp, showcasing her collections.

Entrepreneurial career
In 2010, Ballal announced the setting up of Mysore's first modeling school, JB school of modeling. It has now expanded to offer training in fashion choreography, grooming, cosmetic make-up & other allied fashion trades.

This was closely followed by the launch of 'JB Fresh Face', Mysore's first model hunt in 2011. Into its sixth edition, it is now a permanent fixture on Mysore's fashion calendar.

In 2014, Ballal announced that the first season of the Mysore Fashion Week would be held in September. The event was a success and saw participation from the country's top designers and models.

She repeated her success in 2015, with the second season of Mysore Fashion Week, which witnessed similar participation. The highlight of the event was Ballal's own all-vegan show, designed in collaboration with PETA, that featured Soha Ali Khan.

In June 2016, Ballal announced that the third season of Mysore Fashion Week would be held in September 2016.

Season 4 in 2017 was a three-day event which featured a big line-up of designers including Vijaylakshmi Silks, Trinetra by Raja Pandit, Jayanthi Ballal, Krishna Dembla by Ramesh Dembla, Reshma Kunhi, Rebecca Dewan, Posh Affair by Roshan & Dinendra, Jaheena, Maanay by Ashok Maanay, Zubhe by Kanchan Sabharwal, Shravan Kumar, Crocs Exclusive Showcase, Asif Merchant, and Grand Finale by Archana Kochhar.
Season 4 of Mysore Fashion Week witnessed sandalwood stars Shruthi Hariharan, Pranitha Subhash and Rashmika Mandanna sizzling on the ramp donning some of the best designer wears. The show-stopper for the finale was the current Indian Women's Cricket Team member Harmanpreet Kaur.

Season 5 was held in 2018, Ace designers from across the country were part of this fashion event. Jayanthi Ballal, Saisha Shinde, Ken Ferns, Ashfaq, Kirti Rathore, and many others showcased their latest collections at Mysore Fashion Week.

Personal life
Ballal lives in Mysore, India with her husband and two children.

External links
 Official Website

References

1972 births
Living people